For other ship classes of the same name see Nasty-type patrol boat

The German Nasty class, also known as the Hugin class, were a set of two fast patrol boats built for the post-war German Navy to a Norwegian design and purchased in the 1960s for evaluation purposes. 
In 1964 they were transferred to Turkey.

Service history
Following the end of World War II and during German re-armament in the Cold War era, the German Navy (Bundesmarine) had built a number of fast attack craft classes, mostly developments of the war-time Schnellboot design.
However, in the 1960s the German Navy was interested in the possibilities of a different hull shape, for use in narrow coastal waters. To this end they ordered two vessels from the Norwegian company Båtservice Verft, of Mandal, which had already designed a hard-chined planing hull for its prototype fast patrol boat, the Nasty. 
The two boats were built in 1960, and commissioned under the names Hugin and Munin, after the ravens of Norse mythology. They were designated the Nasty-Klasse and SchnellbootTyp 152.

The two vessels remained in service for four years, but the design/experiment was not a success, and the Bundesmarine disposed of the boats by transferring them to the Turkish Navy in 1964.

List of vessels

Notes

References
 Gardiner, Robert; Chumbley, Stephen Conway's All The World's Fighting Ships 1947–1995 (1995) Naval Institute Press, Annapolis 

Torpedo boats of the German Navy
Napier Deltic
Ships built in Mandal, Norway
Patrol boat classes